Huedin is a town in Cluj County, Transylvania, Romania.

Huedin is located at the northern edge of the Apuseni Mountains. It is surrounded by the villages of Nearșova, Domoșu, Horlacea, and others. The town administers one village, Bicălatu (Magyarbikal). Lately, Huedin has started to be known for its ecotourism initiatives.

Population

The 2011 census data of the town's population counted 9,346 people, of which 59.32% were ethnic Romanians, 28.88% ethnic Hungarians, and 11.45% ethnic Roma.

History
The town of Huedin was founded in the Middle Ages. From 1330 up until 1848, the landlords of the town were the Bánffy family, whence the town's Hungarian name of Bánffyhunyad. The town was part of the Kingdom of Hungary. In 1526, Huedin became part of the Principality of Transylvania and, until 1867, of the Grand Duchy of Transylvania.

The town boasts a strong historical Hungarian heritage. On September 26, 1895, Emperor Franz Joseph visited Bánffyhunyad following the end of Hungarian Army manoeuvres in Transylvania and was given an enthusiastic welcome by the townspeople, who built an arch decorated with the region's flowers and plants for the occasion. In 1910, the town's population was 5,194, of whom 90.5% spoke Hungarian. At that time, 57.5% were Calvinist, 20.7% Jewish, and 10% Roman Catholic. From 1918 to 1940, the town was part of the Kingdom of Romania. From 1940 to 1944, it was again part of Hungary, due to the Second Vienna Award. The town is home to a 13th-century Gothic Reformed Church.

Natives
 Samu Balázs (1906–1981), actor
 Dezideriu Horvath (born 1970), speed skater
 Atilla Kiss B. (born 1963), operatic tenor 
  (1899–1983), painter, graphic designer, and sculptor

Accessibility
The town is accessible by CFR trains from Cluj-Napoca and other cities, such as Oradea, Timișoara, Satu Mare, Brașov, Ploiești, Bucharest, and Budapest. Huedin also lies on the line connecting Budapest to Oradea and Cluj-Napoca.

Images

Notes

External links 

  Huedin Business Center

Towns in Romania
Populated places in Cluj County
Localities in Transylvania
Bánffy family
Shtetls